
Gmina Książ Wielkopolski is an urban-rural gmina (administrative district) in Śrem County, Greater Poland Voivodeship, in west-central Poland.

Villages
Apart from the town of Książ Wielkopolski, Gmina Książ Wielkopolski contains the villages and settlements of Brzóstownia, Charłub, Chrząstowo, Chwałkowo Kościelne, Feliksowo, Gogolewko, Gogolewo, Jarosławki, Kiełczyn, Kiełczynek, Kołacin, Konarskie, Konarzyce, Łężek, Ługi, Mchy, Międzybórz, Obreda, Radoszkowo, Radoszkowo Drugie, Sebastianowo, Sroczewo, Świączyń, Świączynek, Włościejewice, Włościejewki, Zaborowo, Zakrzewice, Zakrzewo and Zawory.

Neighbouring gminas
Gmina Książ Wielkopolski is bordered by the gminas of Dolsk, Jaraczewo, Krzykosy, Nowe Miasto nad Wartą, Śrem and Zaniemyśl.

References
Polish official population figures 2006

Ksiaz Wielkopolski
Śrem County